Like a Hurricane is a third studio album by C. C. Catch. It was a successful album all across the Europe, and almost all of the tracks from the album are well known.

Track listing 
Good Guys Only Win in Movies — 5:42
Like a Hurricane — 3:13
Smoky Joe's Café — 3:41
Are You Man Enough — 3:36
Don't Be a Hero — 3:32
Soul Survivor — 5:13
Midnight Gambler — 4:29
Don't Wait Too Long — 3:22
Dancing in Shadows — 3:34

Credits
Co-producer – Luis Rodriguez 
Music By, Lyrics By, Producer – Dieter Bohlen 
Photography By – Herbert W. Hesselmann

Notes
Distributed by BMG Records.
℗1987 Hansa Records
©1987 BMG Ariola München GmbH

Charts

References

C. C. Catch albums
1987 albums